Acleris monagma is a species of moth of the family Tortricidae. It is found in Nepal.

Adults are variable in colour, with forewings ranging from brownish to ferruginous brown, monochrome or with rudimentary dark brown markings. The ground colour may also be yellowish, brownish yellow or cream with a ferruginous admixture. If present, the reticulation is brown. The markings are brown or blackish and are variably developed. The hindwings are cream or whitish, but greyer at the apex.

References

Moths described in 1976
monagma
Moths of Asia